Magatte Sarr (born 2 September 1999) is a French footballer who currently plays as a midfielder for Championnat National 3 club La Châtaigneraie.

Career statistics

Club

Notes

References

1999 births
Living people
French footballers
French expatriate footballers
Association football midfielders
Cypriot First Division players
Championnat National 3 players
AJ Auxerre players
Enosis Neon Paralimni FC players
Ermis Aradippou FC players
French expatriate sportspeople in Cyprus
Expatriate footballers in Cyprus